Back to the Drawing Board! is the Rubinoos' second album, released on Beserkley Records. Back to the Drawing Board! is a power pop album and fit well with the other power pop bands on Beserkley. This album is known for the single "I Wanna Be Your Boyfriend," which gained notoriety when Rubinoos members Tommy Dunbar and James Gangwer sued Avril Lavigne, alleging that her hit "Girlfriend" had too much in common with it.

The Rubinoos re-released this album with bonus tracks on their own label on November 23, 2011.

Track listing
All tracks composed by James Gangwer and Tommy Dunbar; except where noted.
 "Fallin' in Love" (2:48)
 "I Wanna Be Your Boyfriend" (3:16)
 "Promise Me" (3:22)
 "Hold Me" (Dave Oppenheim, Ira Schuster, Jack Little) - (3:01)
 "Ronnie" (2:38)
 "Drivin' Music" (Jack Gangwer, Jon Rubin, Tommy Dunbar) - (3:13)
 "Operator" (2:57)
 "Jennifer" (Gary Phillips, Jack Gangwer, Tommy Dunbar) - (2:33)
 "Arcade Queen" (2:27)
 "Lightning Love Affair" (Jon Rubin, Rose Bimlet, Tommy Dunbar) - (2:46)
 "1, 2, 3 Forever" (Tommy Dunbar) - (2:43)
 "Rendezvous" (Bonus Cut)
 "Warm Summer Night" (Bonus Cut)
 "Red Light Green Light" (Bonus Cut)
 "Rumble" (Bonus Cut)

Personnel
The Rubinoos
Royse Ader – bass, vocals
Tommy Dunbar – guitar, keyboards, vocals
John Rubin – guitar, vocals
Donn Spindt – percussion, drums, vocals 
Technical
Mark Dodson – engineer
Matthew King Kaufman – producer
Gary Phillips – producer
Michael Zagaris - photography

Releases
 LP Beserkley 1979
 CD Air Mail Recordings 2007

References

External links
 The Rubinoos Discography

1979 albums
The Rubinoos albums
Beserkley Records albums